Lorenz (Lorencino) Bruno Puntel (born September 22, 1935) is a Brazilian philosopher based in Germany, who established the school of Structural-systematic philosophy. Professor emeritus at the University of Munich, Puntel has been named as one of the great contemporary philosophers, articulating his ideas from the most varied traditions.

Career
Puntel studied philosophy, theology, philology and psychology in Munich, Innsbruck, Vienna, Paris, and Rome. He graduated in philosophy in Munich (1968) and in Catholic theology (1969) in Innsbruck. He became a professor at the Institute of Philosophy at the University of Munich in 1978. He was a student of Karl Rahner and studied with Martin Heidegger, whose philosophy concerned him throughout his life.

Philosophical work 
Puntel's thought tries to reconstruct the systematics of philosophy from a very unique viewpoint, which involves the elaboration of a theoretical language, abandoning the idea of a language of predicates. Puntel draws on sources ranging from G. W. Leibniz, German idealism, Heidegger's phenomenology, and even analytic philosophy.

Awards 
Since 1983, he has been a visiting professor at Pittsburgh, Harvard and Princeton. Retired in 2001, In 2016 he received an honorary doctorate from the University of Philosophy in Munich.

 Honorary doctorate from the University of Munich (Professor Emeritus)
 Findlay Book Prize

Bibliography
 Analogy and historicity. Philosophical-historical-critical attempt at the basic problem of metaphysics. Herder Verlag, Freiburg 1969.
 Presentation, method and structure. Investigations in the Unity of Systematic Philosophy of G. W. F. Hegel. Bouvier Verlag, Bonn 1973.
 Theories of Truth in Modern Philosophy. A critical and systematic presentation. Wissenschaftliche Buchgesellschaft, Darmstadt 1978, . 3rd edition 1993.
 (Editor, Introduction) The concept of truth. New attempts at explanation. Scientific Book Society, Darmstadt 1987, .
 Basics of a theory of truth. W. de Gruyter, Berlin / New York 1990, .
 Structure and being. A theoretical framework for a systematic philosophy. Mohr Siebeck Verlag, Tübingen 2006, .
 Being and God. A systematic approach in dealing with M. Heidegger, E. Levinas and J.-L. Marion. Mohr Siebeck Verlag, Tübingen 2010, .
 with Emmanuel Tourpe: Philosophy as a systematic discourse. Dialogues about the basics of a theory of beings. Karl Alber, Freiburg im Breisgau 2014.

References

External links
 Homepage at the LMU

1935 births
20th-century anthropologists
20th-century Brazilian male writers
20th-century Brazilian philosophers
20th-century educational theorists
20th-century essayists
20th-century German male writers
20th-century German philosophers
21st-century anthropologists
21st-century Brazilian male writers
21st-century educational theorists
21st-century essayists
21st-century German male writers
21st-century German philosophers
Analytic philosophers
Brazilian educational theorists
Brazilian essayists
Brazilian people of German descent
Brazilian philosophers
Continental philosophers
Critical theorists
Epistemologists
German educational theorists
German male essayists
German male non-fiction writers
Heidegger scholars
Literacy and society theorists
Living people
Ludwig Maximilian University of Munich alumni
Academic staff of the Ludwig Maximilian University of Munich
Metaphilosophers
Metaphysicians
Metaphysics writers
Ontologists
Phenomenologists
Philosophers of culture
Philosophers of education
Philosophers of history
Philosophers of language
Philosophers of mathematics
Philosophers of mind
Philosophers of religion
Philosophers of science
Philosophers of social science
Philosophy academics
Political philosophers
Social anthropologists
Social philosophers
Sociologists of education
Sociologists of religion
Structuralists
Theorists on Western civilization
Writers about religion and science